Ogilby (formerly, Oglesby) is a ghost town in Imperial County, California, United States. The name is official for federal use, and a feature ID number of 252950 has been assigned. Ogilby is defined by the US Geological Survey as a populated place at  AMSL elevation. It is included in the Imperial County Air Pollution Control District.

History
Ogilby was founded as a railroad stop for the Southern Pacific in 1877, and served as a supply point for the mining communities of Glamis, Hedges, and Tumco. The Oglesby post office operated for part of 1880. The Ogilby post office operated from 1890 to 1895, moving in 1892, and from 1898 to 1942. The name honors E.R. Ogilby, mine promoter. Parts of the second Plank Road were assembled in Ogilby. The town was abandoned by 1961.

Nearby
Ogilby lies along the Union Pacific Railroad tracks east of Algodones Dunes.

Ogilby Hills, to the southeast, have summits in the  AMSL range.

The closest city is Yuma, Arizona, at about  driving distance.

Communications
There is no ZIP code assigned to Ogilby. The area lies within area code 760.

Government

See also
 Araz Junction, California
 Gordons Well, California
 Old Plank Road
 Winterhaven, California
 Glamis, California

References

External links
  Tumco - Hedges - Ogilby, California Gold Mines and Historical Towns, Desert USA

1877 establishments in California
Former settlements in Imperial County, California
Ghost towns in California
Populated places established in 1877